The Man in the Open is a 1919 American silent Western film directed by Ernest C. Warde and starring Dustin Farnum. As an independent production, it was released on a State Rights basis. It is a lost film.

Cast
 Dustin Farnum as Sailor Jesse
 Herschel Mayall as Trevor
 Lamar Johnstone as Bull Brooks
 Joseph J. Dowling as James Brown
 Claire Du Brey as Polly
 Irene Rich as Kate

References

External links
 
 

1919 films
1919 Western (genre) films
1919 lost films
American black-and-white films
Films directed by Ernest C. Warde
Lost American films
Silent American Western (genre) films
1910s American films